Rouphos or Roufos (Greek: Ρούφος) is a Greek surname. It may refer to the following persons:

Athanasios Kanakaris-Roufos (1830–1902), mayor of Patras
Benizelos Roufos (1795–1868), prime minister of Greece
Angelos Roufos (1852–?), Greek politician
Georgios Roufos (1841–1891), mayor of Patras
Ioannis Roufos (1870–1908), Greek politician
Loukas Kanakaris-Roufos (1878–1949), Greek politician
Vasileios Roufos (1880–1960), mayor of Patras

See also
Rufus of Thebes

Greek-language surnames
Surnames